Rosa Frederica Baring FitzGeorge (9 March 1854 – 10 March 1927), was the second daughter of Mr. William Henry Baring, J.P. and Elizabeth Hammersley, of Norman Court in West Tytherley, Hampshire, England. She was a descendant of the famous Sir Francis Baring of the Baring banking family.  Her maternal uncle was Thomas Weguelin, partner of Thomson, Bonar, and Company of London, Director and Governor of the Bank of England.

First marriage
She married first to Captain Frank Wigsell Arkwright August 29, 1878 at Sanderstead, Surrey Court, England and had two children, a son Esme Arkwright, and a daughter Vera Nina Arkwright, later known as Vera Bate Lombardi (b. 1883, London – d. 1948, Rome). The Arkwright marriage ended in divorce in 1885.

Second marriage
Rosa Baring married a second time November 25, 1885 in Paris, France to Colonel George William Adolphus FitzGeorge (24 August 1843, London – 2 September 1907, Lucerne), the eldest of the three sons of Prince George, Duke of Cambridge and Louisa Fairbrother. It is said that Rosa FitzGeorge later used the title "Lady FitzGeorge" while in New York City, in pursuit of wealthy American families to find a husband for her daughter Vera.

Rosa Baring FitzGeorge was not friendly with the families of her two husbands. She made "plenty of capital of the royal blood in the veins of her husband" and as the daughter-in-law of the Duke of Cambridge, Rosa flourished in New York and Chicago as “Lady FitzGeorge". According to the Marquise de Fontenoy her marriage to Colonel FitzGeorge "gave great offense" to his father,  Prince George.

Children
By her first marriage to Frank Wigsell Arkwright:
1. Esme Arkwright (1882–1934)
2. Vera Nina Arkwright, also known as Vera Bate Lombardi (1883–1948)

By her second marriage to George William Adolphus FitzGeorge: 
1. Mabel Iris FitzGeorge (23 September 1886 – 13 April 1976) married in 1912 to Robert Balfour, had issue (Victor FitzGeorge-Balfour). Married secondly, in 1945 to Vladimir Emmanuelovich, Prince Galitzin, no issue.
2. George Daphne FitzGeorge (23 February 1889 – 1 June 1954) married in 1915 to Sir George Foster Earle, divorced in 1926, no issue.
3. Commander George William Frederick FitzGeorge(12 October 1892 – 13 June 1960) married in 1915 to Esther Melina Vignon, divorced in 1927, no issue. Married secondly, in 1934 to France Bellanger, divorced in 1957, no issue.

Daughter
Following her parents' divorce Rosa Baring FitzGeorge's second child Vera Bate Lombardi grew up with her Baring grandparents though she is said to have become the surrogate god child of Margaret Cambridge, Marchioness of Cambridge, wife of Prince Adolphus, Duke of Teck. Rosa Frederica Baring Fitzgeorge was the maternal grandmother of Magic Realist painter Bridget Bate Tichenor, who lived in Mexico from 1956 to 1990.

References

External links 
 
 Ancestry of Elizabeth Hammersley
 Hammersley connection

1854 births
1927 deaths
People from Test Valley
Rosa Frederica
Rosa Frederica Baring FitzGeorge